Shamshera is a 2022 Indian Hindi-language period action drama film produced by Aditya Chopra under Yash Raj Films and directed by Karan Malhotra. The film stars Ranbir Kapoor in his first dual role alongside Sanjay Dutt, Vaani Kapoor, Ronit Roy, and Saurabh Shukla. Set in around 1800s, the story follows a dacoit tribe and their fight for independence against British rule.

Shamshera was theatrically released on 22 July 2022 in IMAX theatres. It received generally negative reviews from critics and eventually emerged as a major box office bomb.

Plot 
1896: Balli is a tribesman from the Khameran tribe, who aspires to become a cop where he asks to provide a test, to a conniving Indian cop named Shudh Singh. Shudh Singh asks him to beat a child to prove his worth, but Balli refuses and takes the child's place and bears the punishment. That night, Balli learns about his father Shamshera's past.

1871: Shamshera is a Khameran tribesman, who along with his people was oppressed by the people of Kaza because of caste and status discrimination. Due to this, Shamshera counterattacks and pillages the kingdom, which leads to Kaza, creating a fearful reputation against the Khamerans. The kings and the wealthy men of the empire seek the help of the British to drive away the Khameran tribe from their village forest. The British accept the deal in exchange for 5000 gold coins.

The British attack the Khameran tribe, but Shamshera and the tribal people fight valiantly and the British flee. Shamshera receives a message that their tribe could live peacefully and regain their lost respect if they promised to stop plundering Kaza and move to a fortress outside the city premises. Shamshera and his men arrive at the forest where they realize that it is a trap led by Shudh Singh, and are captured where they are tortured mercilessly. Shamshera is told by the British to provide 10,000 gold coins, in exchange for sparing the Khameran tribe.

Realizing that the deal would be difficult to achieve inside the fortress. Shamshera forms a plan to help the tribe escape from the fortress, but to no avail where he tells his wife about his plan to frame himself as a traitor and also tells her to cook-up a story to save the tribe from getting killed. Shamshera tries to escape by climbing the wall of the fortress where the officers-in-charge spots Shamshera and shoots him, leaving Shamshera wounded and later getting hanged by Shudh Singh. Believing that Shamshera is a traitor, The tribe develops a hatred against him, thus leaving the truth to be buried.

1896: After learning the truth, Balli fakes his death and escapes from the fortress with the help of Shamshera's trusted ally Pir Baba. When Shamshera decided to move to the fortress, a few Khamerans decided to stay back, where they are now residing in a town named Nagina, and had camouflaged their identities, doing all petty jobs in the town for a living and they were waiting for Shamshera, as he would come and help them regain their lost respect and dignity. As advised by Pir Baba, and with the help of a local dancer named Sona, Balli starts looting the rich people of Kaza and refers himself as Shamshera.

The British General is worried about the new Shamshera. Shudh Singh invites the General for his wedding, where the General deduce that Shamshera would come to the wedding. Balli is able to steal the gold from Shudh Singh's wedding, but his youngest gang member is shot by the sadistic cop.

Though heartbroken, Balli plans to steal the Queen's Crown, which is supposed to arrive at Kaza. Despite tight security, Balli steals the Queen's crown and puts a blot on the British General's reputation. Balli makes a deal with the General to free the Khamerans, in exchange for the Queen's Crown. The General agrees and Balli returns with the surviving members of his crew to the Kaza Fortress. Shudh Singh kills the British forces, and places the blame on Balli, and takes the credit for returning the crown to the queen, but forgets about placing the blame on Khamerans.

The Khamerans learn about Shamshera's sacrifice from Pir Baba, where they get enraged and breaks the fortress's gates to fight alongside Balli. They slaughter the police force. Balli fights Shudh Singh, and he hangs Shudh Singh in the same way, in which he hanged Shamshera. Balli leaves the Queen's Crown to the British General, due to him having saved Sona's life. The Khamerans ride alongside Balli, and are hopeful that they will be able to live a dignified life hereafter.

Cast
Ranbir Kapoor in a dual role as 
Shamshera, a Khameran tribesman
Balli, Shamshera's son
Sanjay Dutt as Daroga Shuddh Singh
Vaani Kapoor as Sona, Balli's wife
Saurabh Shukla as Doodh Singh 
Ronit Roy as Pir Baba
Iravati Harshe as Shamshera's wife, Balli's mother
Craig McGinlay as Colonel Freddy Young
Saurabh Kumar as Chooha
Chitrak Bandhopadyay as Raasho
Mahesh Balraj as Upreti
Rudra Soni as Pitamber
Prakhar Saxena as Bhura
Nagesh Salvan as Dada
Vijay Kaushik as Gulfi
Gauransh Sharma as Keshu

Production

Casting 

Shamshera was officially launched in May 2018 by Yash Raj Films through a motion poster, starring Ranbir Kapoor as the titular character Shamshera. Sanjay Dutt was cast in a pivotal role, and Vaani Kapoor was signed to play the female lead. To prepare her role, Vaani Kapoor took professional training in Kathak.  Kapoor portrays a dancer.

Filming 
Principal photography begun in December 2018. For the film, a massive fort was built at Film City, Goregaon, requiring 2 months of preparation and the effort of nearly 300 workers. Filming ended in September 2020.

Music

Shamshera  soundtrack is composed by Mithoon with lyrics by Mithoon, Karan Malhotra and Piyush Mishra.

Release

Theatrical
Shamshera released in cinemas on 22 July 2022. Originally planned for cinema release on 20 December 2019, Shamshera was later on highly delayed due to the COVID-19 pandemic. It was then rescheduled to 25 June 2021, but due to the second wave of pandemic, the release was postponed to 18 March 2022, that once again got delayed due to Omicron variant spread at the time. It released on 22 July 2022. The film was released in Hindi, Tamil and Telugu and in IMAX theatres.

Home media
The digital streaming rights of the film are sold to Amazon Prime Video. The film digitally streamed on Amazon Prime Video from 19 August 2022 in Hindi and dubbed versions of Tamil and Telugu languages.

Reception

Box office 
Shamshera earned 10.25 crores at the domestic box office on its opening day. On the second day, the film collected 10.50 crore. On the third day, the film collected 11 crore, taking a total domestic opening weekend of 31.75 crore.

Critical response 
Shamshera received mixed to negative reviews from critics. Anna M. M. Vetticad of Firstpost rated the film 3.5 out of 5 stars and wrote "Ranbir is gorgeous in every imaginable way in Shamshera in terms of his acting, sex appeal, dancing, litheness in the action scenes and magnetic personality". Tina Das of The Print rated the film 3.5 out of 5 stars and wrote "While RRR relies heavily on VFX, Ranbir Kapoor's Shamshera affects the heart and feels more realistic with its new caste angle and Vaani Kapoor's acting". Avinash Lohana of Pinkvilla rated the film 3 out of 5 stars and wrote "Karan Malhotra's Shamshera starring Ranbir Kapoor, Vaani Kapoor and Sanjay Dutt is in line with the ongoing trend of workable films, and has the right amount of drama, action, romance, humour and all other masala potboiler elements to entertain the audience". Mugdha Kapoor of DNA India rated the film 3 out of 5 stars and wrote "Ranbir Kapoor shines in the double role, and the film marks the perfect comeback for the actor". A critic for Filmfare rated the film 3 out of 5 stars and wrote "The South film industry has been making such films for the last few years, and Shamshera is Bollywood's bold attempt at replicating the formula. The Hindi film industry needs a renaissance and let's hope this film becomes a catalyst towards it".

Rachana Dubey of The Times of India rated the film 2.5 out of 5 stars and wrote "To sum it up, director and co-writer Karan Malhotra surely seemed to have had a grand vision at the onset, but it's his execution that seems to have betrayed him". Sonil Dedhia of News 18 rated the film 2.5 out of 5 stars and wrote "Shamshera doesn't really have the punch or the thrill that is required to pull off a film of this scale. The film feels a little too long, blame it on weak editing". Shalini Langer of The Indian Express rated the film 2.5 out of 5 stars and wrote "Ranbir Kapoor is efficiently good as Shamshera, a leader of a tribe first treated as outcastes and later betrayed and kept enslaved in a fort". Tushar Joshi of India Today rated the film 2 out of 5 stars and wrote "Shamshera is a mess that needs more than just star power to come to its rescue". Sukanya Verma of Rediff rated the film 2 out of 5 stars and wrote "Shamshera's problem is a shocking inability to support its bombastic ideas with gripping drama. The result is the wastage of not one but two Ranbir Kapoors". Taran Adarsh rated the film 1.5 out of 5 stars, called the film an 'epic disappointment' and wrote, "Even Ranbir Kapoor's star-power cannot save this ship from sinking". Saibal Chatterjee of NDTV rated the film 1 out of 5 stars and wrote "Moral of the story for Ranbir Kapoor - the actor should henceforth read his scripts with a more critical eye before buying into them. He owes it to his talent".

References

External links
 
  Shamshera on Bollywood Hungama

2020s Hindi-language films
Indian action adventure films
Films set in the British Raj
Indian historical action films
Film productions suspended due to the COVID-19 pandemic
Films directed by Karan Malhotra
Yash Raj Films films